Roberto José Hatton Negrón (born 11 October 1976) is a Puerto Rican professional basketball player.  Hatton has most notably played for Marist College in the NCAA and for the Arecibo Captains, San Germán Athletics, and Ponce Lions in Puerto Rico's Baloncesto Superior Nacional.  Hatton has also played professionally in Portugal, Russia, Mexico and France.  Hatton has been a member of the Puerto Rico national basketball team since 1993, taking part in both the 2004 Olympic Games, famous for their defeat of the United States team, as well as the 2006 FIBA World Championship. At the youth level he won a silver medal at the 1997 FIBA Under-22 World Championship.

His #10 jersey was retired by his former team Leones de Ponce in 2017.

References

External links
 Bobby Joe Hatton at Latinbasket
 Bobby Joe Hatton at RealGM

1976 births
Living people
2006 FIBA World Championship players
Atléticos de San Germán players
Baloncesto Superior Nacional players
Basketball players at the 2003 Pan American Games
Basketball players at the 2004 Summer Olympics
BC Spartak Saint Petersburg players
CAB Madeira players
Correcaminos UAT Victoria players
Halcones Rojos Veracruz players
Leones de Ponce basketball players
Marist Red Foxes men's basketball players
Olympic basketball players of Puerto Rico
Pan American Games competitors for Puerto Rico
Point guards
Puerto Rican expatriate basketball people in France
Puerto Rican expatriate basketball people in Mexico
Puerto Rican expatriate basketball people in Portugal
Puerto Rican expatriate basketball people in Russia
Puerto Rican men's basketball players
Puerto Rico men's national basketball team players
SIG Basket players
Sportspeople from Ponce, Puerto Rico